Journal of Men, Masculinities and Spirituality (JMMS) is a free, online, scholarly, peer-reviewed, interdisciplinary, open access journal about men's studies.   JMMS was established 2007, and is published twice a year with provision for other special editions. JMMS was founded by Joseph Gelfer who remains the executive editor.

Overview

JMMS seeks to be as inclusive as possible in its area of enquiry. Papers address the full spectrum of masculinities and sexualities, particularly those which are seldom heard. Similarly, JMMS addresses not only monotheistic religions and spiritualities but also Eastern, indigenous, new religious movements and other spiritualities which resist categorization. JMMS papers address historical and contemporary phenomena as well as speculative essays about future spiritualities.

The first issue of JMMS featured, published in January 2007, an editorial by Joseph Gelfer; research notes of Yvonne Maria Werner and Anna Prestjan; articles by Roland Boer, Frank A. Salamone, David Shneer, Juan M. Marin and Rini Bhattacharya Mehta; and book reviews by Joseph Gelfer, James Bryant, Wisam Mansour, Sophie Smith, Katharina von Kellenbach and Nathan Abrams.

Issues of JMMS are included in the Informit e-Library, an Australasian online scholarly research repository; as well as EBSCO, and  Gale Cengage.

Bibliography
 The Best of Journal of Men, Masculinities and Spirituality, Joseph Gelfer (ed.). Gorgias PressLlc, 2010. .

References

External links
Journal of Men, Masculinities and Spirituality website
JMMS entry on DOAJ
EBSCO Industries official web site

Anthropology journals
Religious studies journals
Open access journals
Sociology journals
Men's studies journals
Biannual journals
Publications established in 2007
English-language journals